General elections were held in the Cayman Islands in November 1980. The result was a victory for the Team for National Unity led by Jim Bodden, which won eight of the twelve seats in the Legislative Assembly.

Results

References

Elections in the Cayman Islands
Cayman
1980 in the Cayman Islands
Cayman
Election and referendum articles with incomplete results
November 1980 events in North America